Live is the first live album by Dutch rock band Golden Earring, released in 1977. It was recorded at the Rainbow Theatre in London on March 25, 1977.

Track listing
All songs written by George Kooymans and Barry Hay except where noted.

Disc 1:

 Candy's Going Bad - 5:06
 She Flies on Strange Wings (Kooymans) - 8:10
 Mad Love's Comin' - 9:53 
 Eight Miles High (Gene Clark, David Crosby, Roger McGuinn) - 10:01
 Vanilla Queen - 11:45

Disc 2:

 To the Hilt - 6:55
 Fightin' Windmills - 8:26
 Con Man - 9:09
 Radar Love - 11:17
 Just Like Vince Taylor - 6:25

Personnel
George Kooymans - guitar, vocals
Rinus Gerritsen - bass guitar, keyboards
Barry Hay - flute, vocals
Cesar Zuiderwijk - drums
Eelco Gelling - guitar

Production
Producer: John Kriek
Engineer: Steve Lillywhite
Mixing: John Kriek, Damon Lyon-Shaw
Illustrations: Koos Van Oostrom

Charts

Certifications

References

Golden Earring live albums
1977 live albums
Polydor Records live albums